Nothopegia is a genus of plants in the family Anacardiaceae.

Species include:
 Nothopegia acuminata J.Sinclair
 Nothopegia aureofulva Bedd. ex Hook.f.
 Nothopegia beddomei Gamble
 Nothopegia castanaefolia (Roth) Ding Hou
 Nothopegia colebrookeana (Wight) Blume
 Nothopegia heyneana (Hook.f.) Gamble
 Nothopegia monadelpha (Roxb.) Forman
 Nothopegia sivagiriana Murugan & Manickam
 Nothopegia travancorica Bedd. ex Hook.f.
 Nothopegia vajravelui K.Ravik. & V.Lakshm.

References

 
Taxonomy articles created by Polbot
Anacardiaceae genera